Tsukuru Midorikawa is a Japanese kickboxer and Muay Thai fighter, fighting out of Tokyo, Japan.

Titles and accomplishments

Shin Nihon Kickboxing Association
 2009 SNKA Welterweight Champion (4 Defenses)
World Kick Boxing Association
2019 WKBA World Super Welterweight Champion

Fight record

|-  style="text-align:center; background:#fbb;"
| 2023-02-11|| Loss ||align=left| Kaito Ono || NO KICK NO LIFE || Tokyo, Japan || TKO (Referee stoppage) || 3 || 0:57

|-  style="background:#c5d2ea;"
| 2022-12-10||Draw  ||align=left| Ricardo Bravo || RISE 163 || Tokyo, Japan || Ext.R Decision (Split) ||  4 || 3:00 

|-  style="background:#c5d2ea;"
| 2022-08-28|| Draw ||align=left| Lee Sung-hyun || RISE 161 || Tokyo, Japan || Ext.R Decision (Majority)  ||  4 || 3:00 
|-  style="text-align:center; background:#cfc"
| 2022-05-28||Win||align=left| T-98 || NO KICK NO LIFE || Tokyo, Japan || Decision (Unanimous) || 3||3:00
|-  style="text-align:center; background:#fbb;"
| 2022-04-24|| Loss||align=left| Toshiyuki Obara|| Suk Wanchai MuayThai Super Fight  || Nagoya, Japan || TKO (Doctor stoppage)|| || 
|-  style="text-align:center; background:#cfc;"
| 2022-01-09|| Win || align=left| Playchumphon Sor.Srisompong ||  NO KICK NO LIFE || Tokyo, Japan ||Decision (Unanimous) ||5 ||3:00
|-  style="text-align:center; background:#fbb;"
| 2021-12-12|| Loss || align=left| Ryotaro ||  RISE 153 || Tokyo, Japan || Decision (Unanimous) || 3 ||3:00
|-  style="text-align:center; background:#cfc;"
| 2021-09-26|| Win || align=left| Kei Kakinuma ||  Battle Of MuayThai – ouroboros 2021 – || Tokyo, Japan || KO (Straight to the Body) || 2 ||1:25 
|-  style="text-align:center; background:#cfc;"
| 2021-08-22|| Win ||align=left| Motoyasukku || Japan Kick CHALLENGER.3 〜Beyond the limit〜 || Tokyo, Japan || Decision || 5 ||3:00 
|-  style="background:#c5d2ea;"
| 2021-07-22|| Draw|| align=left| Yuya || NO KICK NO LIFE Shin Shou Yuigadokuson|| Tokyo, Japan || Decision ||3 || 3:00
|-  bgcolor="#cfc"
| 2021-06-18|| Win ||align=left| Hirokatsu Miyagi || RISE 150 || Tokyo, Japan || Decision (Majority) || 3 || 3:00
|-  bgcolor="#cfc"
| 2021-02-24|| Win||align=left| Kakushi Takagi || NO KICK NO LIFE Shin Shou Ungaisouten || Tokyo, Japan || Decision (Unanimous) || 3|| 3:00
|-  bgcolor="#fbb"
| 2020-12-18|| Loss ||align=left| Yuya || RISE 144 || Tokyo, Japan || Ext.R Decision (Unanimous) || 4 || 3:00
|-  style="background:#fbb;"
| 2020-10-11|| Loss ||align=left| Kaito || RISE DEAD OR ALIVE 2020 Yokohama||  Yokohama, Japan || Decision (Unanimous) || 3 || 3:00
|-  bgcolor="#cfc"
| 2020-07-19|| Win||align=left| BeyNoah || RISE 140|| Tokyo, Japan || Decision (Unanimous) || 3|| 3:00
|-  bgcolor="#cfc"
| 2020-04-17|| Win||align=left| Yamato Nishikawa || Road to ONE 2nd|| Tokyo, Japan || Decision (Unanimous) || 3|| 3:00
|-  style="background:#cfc;"
| 2019-12-08 || Win ||align=left| Gamlaipet AyothayaFightgym || SNKA SOUL IN THE RING CLIMAX || Tokyo, Japan || Decision (Majority) || 5 || 3:00
|-
! style=background:white colspan=9 |
|-  style="background:#cfc;"
| 2019-11-17 || Win ||align=left| Chuchai Hadesworkout || JAPAN KICKBOXING INNOVATION 6 || Okayama, Japan || Decision (Unanimous) || 3 || 3:00
|-  style="background:#fbb;"
| 2019-06-01 || Loss ||align=left| Khunsuk Sitchefboontham || BOM SEASON II vol.2-The Battle Of Muaythai|| Yokohama, Japan || Decision (Unanimous) || 5 || 3:00
|-
! style=background:white colspan=9 |
|-  style="background:#cfc;"
| 2019-04-14 || Win ||align=left| Petkangtong Por. Phetsiri || SNKA TITANS NEOS 25 || Tokyo, Japan || TKO || 3 || 1:44
|-  style="background:#cfc;"
| 2019-02-11 || Win||align=left| Kentaro Hokuto || KNOCK OUT 2019 WINTER THE ANSWER IS IN THE RING || Tokyo, Japan || Decision (Unanimous) || 5 || 3:00
|-  style="background:#cfc;"
| 2018-12-09 || Win ||align=left| Sareem Bantong || SNKA SOUL IN THE RING 16 || Tokyo, Japan || TKO || 3 || 0:27
|-  style="background:#fbb;"
| 2018-10-08 || Loss || align=left| Hinata || REBELS.58 || Tokyo, Japan ||Decision (Majority) || 3 || 3:00
|-  style="background:#cfc;"
| 2018-08-18 || Win||align=left| Hiroki Shishido || KNOCK OUT SUMMER FES.2018 || Tokyo, Japan || TKO (Doctor Stoppage) || 2 || 1:26
|-  style="background:#fbb;"
| 2018-06-27 || Loss ||align=left| Sibmean Sitchefboontham || Rajadamnern Stadium|| Bangkok, Thailand || Decision || 5 || 3:00
|-
! style=background:white colspan=9 |
|-  style="background:#cfc;"
| 2018-04-15 || Win ||align=left| Anibal Cianciaruso || SNKA  TITANS NEOS 23 || Tokyo, Japan || TKO || 1 || 2:45
|-  style="background:#cfc;"
| 2017-12-10 || Win ||align=left| Sakuntong Torponchai || SNKA SOUL IN THE RING 15 || Tokyo, Japan || KO (Corner Stoppage) || 2 || 1:44
|-  style="background:#cfc;"
| 2017-10-22 || Win ||align=left| Ponpanom PetpumMuaythai || SNKA MAGNUM 45 || Tokyo, Japan || KO (Right Low Kick) || 3 || 1:29
|-  style="background:#fbb;"
| 2017-08-20 || Loss ||align=left| Soichiro Miyakoshi || KNOCK OUT vol.4 || Tokyo, Japan || Decision (Unanimous) || 5 || 3:00
|-  style="background:#cfc;"
| 2017-07-02 || Win ||align=left| Gen PetpumMuaythai || SNKA MAGNUM 44 || Tokyo, Japan || TKO || 1 || 1:02
|-  style="background:#fbb;"
| 2017-05-14 || Loss ||align=left| Horduangsomgpong Nayoeitasala || SNKA WINNERS 2017 2nd || Tokyo, Japan || Decision (Unanimous) || 3 || 3:00
|-  style="background:#cfc;"
| 2017-03-12 || Win ||align=left| Tananchai Sor.Lakchart || SNKA MAGNUM 43 || Tokyo, Japan || TKO (Left Hook) || 3 || 0:26
|-  style="background:#cfc;"
| 2016-12-11 || Win ||align=left| Ikkiusang PepporMuaythai || SNKA SOUL IN THE RING XIV || Tokyo, Japan || TKO (Left Knee) || 5 || 2:10
|-  style="background:#c5d2ea;"
| 2016-10-23 || Draw ||align=left| Sibmean Sitchefboontham || SNKA MAGNUM 42|| Tokyo, Japan || Decision || 5 || 3:00
|-  style="background:#cfc;"
| 2016-05-15 || Win ||align=left| Pakkao Taponenganeun || SNKA WINNERS 2016 2nd || Tokyo, Japan || TKO (Corner Stoppage) || 4 || 2:32
|-  style="background:#cfc;"
| 2016-03-13 || Win ||align=left| Makoto Kimura || SNKA MAGNUM 40 || Tokyo, Japan || Decision (Majority) || 5 || 3:00
|-  style="background:#cfc;"
| 2015-12-13 || Win ||align=left| Superbarn HontornMuaythaigym|| SNKA SOUL IN THE RING 13|| Tokyo, Japan || KO (Left Hook) || 3 || 1:09
|-  style="background:#cfc;"
| 2015-10-25 || Win ||align=left| Jin Shijun || SNKA MAGNUM 39|| Tokyo, Japan || TKO (Doctor Stoppage) || 3 || 0:28
|-  style="background:#fbb;"
| 2015-07-12 || Loss ||align=left| Remtong Tor.Ponchai || SNKA MAGNUM 38|| Tokyo, Japan || TKO (Doctor Stoppage) || 4 || 1:13
|-  style="background:#cfc;"
| 2015-04-19 || Win ||align=left| Parannem Sor.Tilabsun|| SNKA TITANS NEOS 17|| Tokyo, Japan || TKO (Doctor Stoppage) || 4 || 2:39
|-  style="background:#fbb;"
| 2015-02-11 || Loss ||align=left| Jose Ingramgym|| NO KICK NO LIFE 2015|| Tokyo, Japan || TKO (Doctor Stoppage) || 3 || 2:22
|-  style="background:#cfc;"
| 2014-12-14 || Win ||align=left| Kenji Watanabe|| SNKA Soul in the Ring XII|| Tokyo, Japan || Decision (Unanimous) || 3 || 3:00
|-  bgcolor="#cfc"
| 2014-10-26 || Win || align=left| Petranpun Sitsamart|| SNKA MAGNUM 36 || Tokyo, Japan || KO || 5 || 1:28
|-  bgcolor="#cfc"
| 2014-07-20 || Win || align=left| Pongsiri P.K.Saenchaimuaythaigym || SNKA MAGNUM 35 || Tokyo, Japan || Decision (Unanimous)|| 5 || 3:00
|-  style="background:#CCFFCC;"
| 2014-04-20 ||Win ||align=left| Daonoi Mor.Puwana|| SNKA TITANS NEOS 15|| Tokyo, Japan || KO || 1 || 2:00
|-  style="background:#cfc;"
| 2014-02-11 || Win ||align=left| Andy Souwer || Rikix: No Kick No Life 2014  || Tokyo, Japan || Decision (Split) || 3 || 3:00
|-  style="background:#c5d2ea;"
| 2013-12-08 || Draw ||align=left| Kenji Watanabe|| SNKA SOUL IN THE RING VI|| Tokyo, Japan || Decision || 5 || 3:00
|-
! style=background:white colspan=9 |
|-  style="background:#CCFFCC;"
| 2013-10-13 ||Win ||align=left| Pupanlek Acegym|| SNKA MAGNUM 33|| Tokyo, Japan || TKO || 3 || 1:39
|-  style="background:#CCFFCC;"
| 2013-07-21 ||Win ||align=left| Rocky Sodai || SNKA MAGNUM 32|| Tokyo, Japan || KO || 2 || 0:46
|-  style="background:#CCFFCC;"
| 2013-04-14 ||Win ||align=left| T-98 || REBELS 15|| Tokyo, Japan || Decision (Majority) || 5 || 3:00
|-  style="background:#CCFFCC;"
| 2013-03-10 ||Win ||align=left| Togo || SNKA MAGNUM 31|| Tokyo, Japan || Decision (Unanimous) || 3 || 3:00
|-  style="background:#CCFFCC;"
| 2012-12-09 ||Win ||align=left| Suwilek Rajasaklek|| SNKA SOUL IN THE RING IX|| Tokyo, Japan || TKO || 3 || 1:50
|-  style="background:#CCFFCC;"
| 2012-10-14 ||Win ||align=left| Hayato Otsuka|| SNKA MAGNUM 30|| Tokyo, Japan || Decision (Unanimous) || 5 || 3:00
|-
! style=background:white colspan=9 |
|-  style="background:#cfc;"
| 2012-08-22 || Win||align=left| Sailom Sor.Suppatara|| Rajadamnern Stadium || Bangkok, Thailand || KO (Punches)  || 4 ||
|-  style="background:#fbb;"
| 2012-04-22 || Loss ||align=left| Atsuhisa Sasatani|| SNKA TITANS NEOS 11|| Tokyo, Japan || Decision (Majority) || 3 || 3:00
|-  style="background:#fbb;"
| 2012-01-15 || Loss ||align=left| Siripong Lukprabat|| SNKA BRAVE HEARTS 18|| Tokyo, Japan || TKO (Doctor Stoppage) || 3 || 0:33
|-  style="background:#CCFFCC;"
| 2011-09-04 ||Win ||align=left| Yuya Takeuchi || SNKA TITANS NEOS X|| Tokyo, Japan || Decision (Unanimous) || 3 || 3:00
|-  style="background:#CCFFCC;"
| 2011-07-24 ||Win ||align=left| Kenji Watanabe|| SNKA MAGNUM 26|| Tokyo, Japan || Decision (Split) || 5 || 3:00
|-
! style=background:white colspan=9 |
|-  style="background:#CCFFCC;"
| 2011-05-15 ||Win ||align=left| Sanmuk Sasiprapa|| SNKA BRAVE HEARTS 16|| Tokyo, Japan || Ext. R Decision (Unanimous) || 4 || 3:00
|-  style="background:#CCFFCC;"
| 2011-04-17 ||Win ||align=left| Yuki Takewaka|| SNKA TITANS NEOS IX|| Tokyo, Japan || Decision (Unanimous) || 3 || 3:00
|-  style="background:#CCFFCC;"
| 2010-12-18 ||Win ||align=left| Sonlam Sor.Udomson|| SNKA SOUL IN THE RING VII|| Tokyo, Japan || TKO || 3 ||
|-  style="background:#CCFFCC;"
| 2010-10-24 ||Win ||align=left| Choichi Sasaki|| SNKA MAGNUM 24|| Tokyo, Japan || Decision (Unanimous) || 3 || 3:00
|-  style="background:#c5d2ea;"
| 2010-03-07 ||NC ||align=left| Zen Fujita || SNKA MAGNUM 22|| Tokyo, Japan || KO || 4 || 2:26
|-
! style=background:white colspan=9 |
|-  style="background:#fbb;"
| 2009-12-13 || Loss ||align=left| Kunsuk Arabiagym|| SNKA SOUL IN THE RING VII|| Tokyo, Japan || Decision (Majority) || 5 || 3:00
|-  style="background:#CCFFCC;"
| 2009-10-25 ||Win ||align=left| Kenji Watanabe|| SNKA MAGNUM 21|| Tokyo, Japan || Decision (Unanimous) || 3 || 3:00
|-  style="background:#CCFFCC;"
| 2009-07-12 ||Win ||align=left| Togo || SNKA MAGNUM 20|| Tokyo, Japan || Decision (Unanimous) || 3 || 3:00
|-  style="background:#CCFFCC;"
| 2009-05-31 ||Win ||align=left| Kenji Ogino || SNKA BRAVE HEARTS 11|| Tokyo, Japan || KO || 5 || 2:17
|-
! style=background:white colspan=9 |
|-  style="background:#cfc;"
| 2009–02 || Win ||align=left| || Omnoi Stadium || Thailand ||KO || 4 ||
|-  style="background:#fbb;"
| 2009– ||Loss ||align=left| || Rajadamnern Stadium || Bangkok, Thailand ||Decision || 5 || 3:00
|-  style="background:#c5d2ea;"
| 2008-12-14 || Draw ||align=left| Kenji Watanabe || SNKA SOUL IN THE RING VI|| Tokyo, Japan ||Decision || 3 || 3:00
|-  style="background:#CCFFCC;"
| 2008-10-25 ||Win ||align=left| Shuhei Tsuchiya || SNKA MAGNUM 18|| Tokyo, Japan || Decision (Unanimous) || 3 || 3:00

|-  style="background:#fbb;"
| 2008–08-22 ||Loss ||align=left| Chaowalit Jockygym || Liboren Fight Night VII || Hong Kong ||Decision || 5 || 3:00
|-  style="background:#CCFFCC;"
| 2008-06-29 ||Win ||align=left| Yuto || SNKA ATTACK 8|| Tokyo, Japan || KO || 1 || 1:36
|-  style="background:#fbb;"
| 2008-04-20 ||Loss ||align=left| Isorasak Siseksak|| SNKA TITANS NEOS III || Tokyo, Japan ||Decision (Unanimous) || 3 || 3:00
|-  style="background:#CCFFCC;"
| 2008-02-24 ||Win ||align=left| Takao Mochida || SNKA ATTACK 7|| Tokyo, Japan || Decision (Unanimous) || 3 || 3:00
|-  style="background:#c5d2ea;"
| 2007-12-09 || Draw ||align=left| Zen Fujita || SNKA Soul in the Ring V|| Tokyo, Japan ||Decision || 3 || 3:00
|-  style="background:#fbb;"
| 2007-09-16 ||Loss ||align=left| Sonlam Sor.Udomson|| SNKA TITANS NEOS 2 || Tokyo, Japan ||Decision (Unanimous) || 3 || 3:00
|-  style="background:#c5d2ea;"
| 2007-07-08||NC ||align=left| Hirokazu || SNKA ATTACK 5|| Tokyo, Japan ||  || 1 ||
|-  style="background:#c5d2ea;"
| 2006-12-10 ||Draw ||align=left| Taishi Sasaki || SNKA SOUL IN THE RING IV || Tokyo, Japan ||Decision || 3 || 3:00
|-  style="background:#CCFFCC;"
| 2006-09-23 ||Win ||align=left| Techarin Chuwattana|| SNKA ATTACK 2 || Tokyo, Japan ||Decision (Majority) || 3 || 3:00
|-  style="background:#c5d2ea;"
| 2006-07-16 ||Draw ||align=left| Takao Mochida || SNKA MAGNUM 11 || Tokyo, Japan ||Decision || 3 || 3:00
|-  style="background:#c5d2ea;"
| 2006-05-21 ||Draw ||align=left| Taishi Sasaki || SNKA BRAVE HEARTS 2 || Tokyo, Japan ||Decision || 3 || 3:00
|-  style="background:#CCFFCC;"
| 2006-02-26 ||Win ||align=left| Takashi Goto || SNKA ATTACK || Tokyo, Japan ||TKO || 1 || 2:42
|-  style="background:#CCFFCC;"
| 2005-12-11 ||Win ||align=left| Masato Ochiai || SNKA SOUL IN THE RING III || Tokyo, Japan ||KO || 2 || 2:02
|-  style="background:#CCFFCC;"
| 2005-10-29 ||Win ||align=left| Shūhei Tsuchiya  || SNKA NO KICK, NO LIFE ～FINAL～ || Tokyo, Japan ||Decision (Majority)|| 2 || 3:00
|-  style="background:#CCFFCC;"
| 2005-06-12 ||Win ||align=left| Shinya Uzuki  || SNKA Ryusha tachi no Chosen PART VI || Tokyo, Japan ||Decision (Unanimous)|| 2 || 3:00
|-
| colspan=9 | Legend:

References

Living people
1986 births
Japanese male kickboxers